The Cimarron Historic District  is a historic district on the south side of Cimarron, New Mexico, United States.  The district is located south of US Route 64 on the east and west sides of New Mexico Highway 21.  In 1973, the district was added to the U.S. National Register of Historic Places.  According to the National Register, the district contains  and contains 6 significant buildings.

There are fifteen buildings and historic sites shown on a 1986 map of the historic district 

Early trading post.  Location of Lucien Maxwell commissary.
Graves of mother-in-law and daughter of Lucien Maxwell.
Plaza well, dug about 1871.
Site of Lucien Maxwell home.
Former National Hotel.
Office of the Cimarron News built about 1872.
St. James Hotel.   Listed on State Register (12/20/68)
The Adobe, built before 1892.
Second Colfax County Courthouse, 1870.  Listed on State Register (5/19/86).
Aztec Grist Mill, built in 1864 for Lucien B. Maxwell.  Now known as the Old Mill Museum. Listed on State Register (12/20/68).
Tom Boggs home, built about 1865.
Immaculate Conception Catholic Church, built 1881-1884?
Schwenk Hall.
Juan Charette's saloon.
Colfax County jail, 1872.

See also

National Register of Historic Places listings in Colfax County, New Mexico

References

External links

Geography of Colfax County, New Mexico
Historic districts on the National Register of Historic Places in New Mexico
National Register of Historic Places in Colfax County, New Mexico